Subarnalata was a Bengali television series that originally aired on Zee Bangla in 2010, and was based on the second part of the book trilogy by Ashapoorna Devi of the same name. It premiered from April 2010 at 6pm and was shifted to 8:30pm from July 2010. During the lock-down imposed in March 2020 due to the COVID-19 pandemic, all shooting at sets was shut. Following huge audience request, Subarnalata began re-telecasted.

Plot 
Subarnalata chronicles the life and times of Subarno who is brought up in a progressive household by her mother Satyabati, by enrolling her to Bethune School and imparting in her a deep sense of love for the motherland and respect for the freedom fighters who fought the British. However, Subarno is tricked into marrying at the tender age of 9 into an orthodox family. The marriage is held against Satyabati's wishes and her knowledge by her mother-in-law and Subarno's grandmother, Elokeshi. The incident prompts Satyabati to not acknowledge the marriage in front of Subarno's inlaws. Satyabati's reaction infuriates the in-laws of Subarno, that forms the crux of the treatment meted out to Subarno in later days.

The plot mainly revolves around the pathetic circumstances and oppression women of that era were subjected to in orthodox families, who had no voices of their own. Subarno, a strong headed courageous but kind and generous woman, defies all the brutalities of her husband, Prabodh, a hot headed orthodox man, who is unable to accept his beautiful wife's progressive thoughts and is always suspicious of her noble intentions. Subarno's kindhearted ways are supported by her eldest brother-in-law Subodh, and elder sister-in-law Susheel and her open-minded husband Kedar babu. She forges a strong bond with her youngest sister-in-law, Raju (Biraaj), who though dislikes Subarno in the initial days after Subarno's entry in the family, but grows fond of her gradually.

The show presents Subarno's realization that to bring about a change, one does not need to wield a weapon like the revolutionaries fighting the British in India but by trying to gradually peel off the harmful traditions by staying within the same society. It documents her daily struggles and turmoils to win the little victories with her perseverance, courage and intelligence and the hardships that she has to go through to achieve them.

Cast

 Ananya Chatterjee as Satyabati / Subarnalata: Satyabadi's daughter(After some years Subarnalata) (MejoBou)
 Ipshita Mukherjee as Young Subarnalata: Satyabati's 9 Years old daughter, Married in Younger age daughter
 Sabitri Chatterjee as Muktokeshi Debi:Prabodh, Subodh, Biraj, Prabhash and Prakash's mother- Subarnalata,Umashasi,Bindu and Giribala's mother in law
 Biswanath Basu as Prabodh: Subarnalata's husband, Muktokeshi's second son- Prabhas's, Prakash's elder brother and Subodh's younger brother
 Saugata Bandhopadhay as young Prabodh- Muktokeshi's child Son, Married in 17 years old.
 Biplab Banerjee as Nabakumar
 Papiya Sen as Sodu Pisi
 Kunal Padhi as Ramkali (Satyabati's father)
 Anirban Guha as Subodh: Muktokeshi's first son, Umashasi's husband- Prakash, Prabhash's and Prabod's elder brother
 Ratri Ghatak as Umasashi: Subodh's wife (Baro Bou)
 Maitryee Mitra as young Umasashi
 Nina Chakroborty as Biraj
 Diya Chakraborty as young Biraj
 Avijit Sarkar as Prabhas
 Ronit Ganguly as young Prabash
 Sneha Chatterjee as Giribala (Prabhas's wife, SejoBou)
 Biswajit Ghosh Majumder as Prakash
 Arpon Das as Young Prakash
 Antara Nandy as Bindu (Prakash's wife, ChotoBou)
 Sanjib Sarkar as Jagu Dada
 Chitra Sen as Shyamasundari Debi (Jagu's mother)
 Sumanta Mukherjee as Kedar Babu.
 Debarati Paul as Young Bakul
 Debaparna Chakraborty as Adult Bakul
 Indrasish Roy as Adult Sunirmal
 Rajat Ganguly as Parimal Ghoshal (Sunirmal's father)
 Ahana Ghosh as Young Chanpa/Nalini (a student of the Satyabati's school)
 Sofia Chattopadhyay as Adult Chanpa (Subarnalata's first child)
 Pritha Chatterjee as Jayabati
 Aratrika Roy as Young Parul
 Samata Chatterjee Lahiri as Adult Mallika (Subodh and Umasashi's first daughter).
 Lovely Maitra as Wife of Subarnalata's eldest son

Trivia 
The title track of Subarnalata was rendered by Bangladeshi musician Anusheh Anadil and was composed by Pandit Tanmoy Bose. The track received critical acclaim for both Anadil and Bose and they were awarded Zee Bangla Gourav award.

References 

2010 Indian television series debuts
Zee Bangla original programming